Wellington School is a co-educational independent boarding and day school in the English public school tradition for pupils aged 3–18 located in Wellington, Somerset, England. Wellington School was founded in 1837.

Wellington School is a registered charity and has around 800 pupils currently in attendance. Around 150 of those pupils are boarders. The school is a member of the Headmasters' and Headmistresses' Conference. Wellington School is based on a 35-acre campus in Wellington, Somerset.

Wellington School operates is own feeder preparatory school, Wellington Prep School which shares the main campus. Wellington Prep School students often use the sporting pitches and science labs of Wellington School.

History

Wellington School is situated to the south of the centre of the small town of Wellington. It was founded originally as Wellington Academy in 1837 as an all-boys school by Benjamin Frost (Headmaster 1837–1848). It was later purchased and run by Frost's wife and William Corner (Headmaster 1848–1879). In 1879 under new headmaster Francis Raban renamed the school West Somerset County School, although only 34 years later the school was again renamed but this time as Wellington School, the name it retains today.

The school was originally founded as a private all boys school, but in the early 1970s girls were first accepted into the Sixth Form. From 1979 girls were accepted from the age of 10.

The school's arms consist of one quarter of the Duke of Wellington's arms, the dragons represent the County of Somerset and the open book represents learning.

The school opened a new junior school in 2000, having previously only catered for pupils aged 10 and over. This was renamed "Wellington Prep School" in 2015.

In 2003 the Princess Royal opened the Princess Royal Sports Complex, a £2.65 million indoor sports facility. The Princess Royal Sports Complex was offered to competitors in the 2012 London Olympics for training.

The Good Schools Guide described Wellington School as "Friendly, purposeful and busy, it is a solid, well-managed school, neat but not glossy, giving its pupils a sound education and masses of high points in developmental experience." The Guide also described Wellington School as "Down to earth. Punches above its weight. No sense of entitlement. Good value for money. Not our words, those of a parent. Says it for us, too".

Sports

The school has rugby pitches, cricket squares, football pitches, an all-weather pitch, all-weather training areas, tennis courts, squash courts, climbing wall and an indoor swimming pool.

Football was reintroduced in the 2003 school year.

Many students have gone on to represent the school in county and England hockey, national athletics, county and England fencing and county rugby.

Music

The school's music department, dedicated to the ex-headmaster George Corner, includes a recording studio, iMac suite, and percussion studio as well as many practice rooms and two classrooms. All 15 pianos in the department are by Steinway & Sons, accrediting the school as an 'All Steinway School', the first of its kind in England.

Regular concerts are held throughout the school year, performance spaces include the department's 'Small Hall', the school's main hall (Great Hall) and the school chapel which is fitted with an electronic organ alongside a Steinway baby grand.

Chapel

Built between 1928 and 1931 by C. H. Biddulph-Pinchard, the Grade II listed red brick building is dressed with stone and has a flat roof which is concealed behind a parapet. It is a rectangular single-cell chapel with a carved stone altar. The Chapel went through specialist restoration work in 2013 which involved the repainting of the ceiling among other maintenance tasks. This restoration was funded partly by the school's Old Wellingtonians' Association

The east end of the building holds choir stalls and an organ loft over the entrance vestibule. The interior is highly decorated with finely carved wooden wall panels and elaborately decorated canopies made of molded plaster.

The Church of England Chapel has a full-time Chaplain who prepares pupils for Confirmation annually. Though some assemblies and concerts are also held in the building, there are Sunday services throughout term time for boarders and members of the public; these involve regular performances by the school's chapel choir. There are also shorter services most days during the week with pupils attending on a house rota basis.

The Chapel was built as a memorial to those who fell during the first world war. George Corner, the then headmaster, wrote to the Old Boys and asked for their support in the project. The 37 members of the Wellington School Community who gave their lives are listed on the walls of the Chapel. Each year a pupil from each boarding house remembers one former pupil specifically, researching how and where they died and a basket of flowers is laid in their memory.

Confirmation and all the other occasional offices of the church are open to all members of the school community on request.

Combined Cadet Force
The school has a marching band and active Combined Cadet Force, founded in 1901. The Combined Cadet Force is open to senior school pupils, and has upwards of 170 cadets across the Royal Navy, Army and Air Force sections.

The cadets learn military based skills such as drill, weapons handling, map and compass, battlecraft, climbing, abseiling and leadership development. There are various CCF camps, military training weekends and cadet competitions each year, during which the cadets go on field manoeuvres in order to apply the skills they have learned in a practical situation.

Wellington School is unique in having three field exercises a year, each lasting three days and two nights.  A full-time member of staff at Wellington School runs the CCF and acts as the senior officer. He is assisted by an experienced warrant officer. The cadets are required to present themselves for inspection by the masters in charge of each section on a weekly basis.

Headteachers

Senior School Headteachers 
 1837 – 1848 Benjamin Frost
 1848 – 1879 William Corner
 1879 – 1885 Francis Raban
 1885 – 1899 James Beuttler
 1899 – 1938 George Corner
 1938 – 1945 Aubrey Price
 1945 – 1957 M Banks-Williams
 1957 – 1973 James Stredder
 1973 – 1990 John Kendall-Carpenter
 1990 – 2006 Alan Rogers
 2006 – 2014 Martin Reader
 2014 – 2019 Henry Price
 Since 2019 Eugene Du Toit

Prep School Headteachers 

 2000-2004 John Wyatt
 2004-2010 Harry McFaul
 2010–2020 Adam Gibson
 Since 2020 Victoria Richardson

Notable alumni

Reza Abdoh Persian-American playwright and poet
Salar Abdoh Persian-American author and journalist
Jeffrey Archer, Baron Archer, author and politician
John Baker DL, judge and politician
Thomas Benyon OBE, politician
Brigadier Shelford Bidwell OBE, army officer and military historian
Tom Carson, Great Britain international hockey player 
Sir David Chipperfield CBE, architect
Rear Admiral Paul Chivers CBE, naval officer
John Fraser Drummond DFC, fighter pilot
Keith Floyd, chef, television presenter and restaurateur
Sir Geoffrey Follows CMG, Financial Secretary of Hong Kong
Charles Garnsworthy OBE, Baron Garnsworthy, politician
Herbert Gamlin, England international rugby union player
Frank Gillard CBE, BBC broadcaster and administrator
 Harriet Hawkins, cultural geographer
 Colonel Cecil Law CB DL, Baron Ellenborough, army officer and politician
 Bob Moran, cartoonist and anti-vaccine campaigner.
 David Oxley, actor
Vice Admiral Duncan Potts CB, naval officer
 John Robins, Wales international rugby union player 
 Simon Singh MBE, science author
Tom Singh OBE, founder of New Look
 Rachel Skinner FREng, President of Institution of Civil Engineers
 Peter St George-Hyslop OC FRS, physician scientist
David Suchet CBE, actor
 Sir Nigel Sweeney, High Court judge
Lieutenant-General Sir Freddie Viggers KCB CMG DL, army officer and Gentleman Usher of the Black Rod

Notable staff

John Kendall-Carpenter was headmaster of the school from 1973 to 1990. Kendall-Carpenter was President of the Rugby Football Union from 1980 to 1981, the England Schools Rugby Football Union from 1985 to 1990 and the Cornish Rugby Football Union from 1984 to 1987. He was also chairman of the committee that organised the first Rugby World Cup in 1987.

Arms

Scandals

 A maths teacher, Andrew Crozier, was forced to quit in March 2003 after starting a sexual relationship with the 18-year-old head girl.
 Another maths teacher, Ian Sarginson, was convicted of indecently assaulting an underage male pupil in March 2004 and sent to prison.

References

External links
 Wellington School's official website
 Wellington School's Princess Royal Sports Complex
 Independent Schools Inspectorate Inspection Reports

Private schools in Somerset
Boarding schools in Somerset
Member schools of the Headmasters' and Headmistresses' Conference
Educational institutions established in 1837
School sexual abuse scandals
1837 establishments in England
Wellington, Somerset